{{Infobox television
| image          = The Old Grey Whistle Test title card 1970s black sky variant.png
| caption        = One of 1970s opening titles
| alt_name       = Whistle Test (1983–88)
| runtime        = 40–60 minutes
| creator        = Rowan AyersMike Appleton
| developer      =
| producer       = Mike Appleton
| presenter      = Richard WilliamsIan WhitcombBob HarrisAnnie NightingaleAndy KershawDavid HepworthMark Ellen Richard SkinnerRo Newton
| opentheme      = Stone Fox Chase - Area Code 615 (1971-83)
| country        = United Kingdom
| company        = BBC Television
| network        = BBC2 (1971–88)BBC Four (One-off special, 2018)
| first_aired    = 
| last_aired     = 
| num_episodes   = 
| picture_format = 576i (PAL)
| audio_format   = Mono
| language       = English 
}}The Old Grey Whistle Test (sometimes abbreviated to Whistle Test or OGWT) is a British television music show. The show was devised by BBC producer Rowan Ayers, commissioned by David Attenborough and aired on BBC2 from 1971 to 1988. It took over the BBC2 late-night slot from Disco 2, which ran between September 1970 and July 1971, while continuing to feature non-chart music. The original producer, involved in an executive capacity throughout the show's entire history, was Michael Appleton.

According to presenter Bob Harris, the programme derived its name from a Tin Pan Alley phrase from years before. When they got the first pressing of a record they would play it to people they called the old greys – doormen in grey suits. Any song the doormen could remember and whistle, having heard it just once or twice, had passed the old grey whistle test.

On 23 February 2018, a one-off live three-hour special of The Old Grey Whistle Test was broadcast on BBC Four, hosted by Harris to mark 30 years since the final episode aired.

History
Launched on BBC2, the show focused on albums, rather than chart hits covered on BBC1 by Top of the Pops. It was originally produced in a studio at BBC Television Centre in west London known as "Pres B", which had been originally designed for shooting weather forecasts and in-vision continuity. The studio was only . Due to the lack of technology that accommodated live performances, bands mimed to tracks in early episodes.

The original opening credits were played over a naked woman, painted in green, dancing to Santana's "Jingo". When Richard Williams was replaced by 'Whispering' Bob Harris, the series' opening titles theme was changed to the now more famous animation of a male figure made up of stars (known as the 'Star Kicker') dancing. The programme's title music, with its harmonica theme, was a track called "Stone Fox Chase" by a Nashville band, Area Code 615.

The first host was Richard Williams, features editor of Melody Maker, the music weekly. From 1972, the programme was presented by disc jockey Bob Harris (nicknamed "Whispering Bob Harris" because of his quiet voice and laid-back style). He later became notorious among the younger generation for distancing himself on air from Roxy Music's first performance on the show and calling the New York Dolls "mock rock" and left OGWT in 1978.

In the programme's early days, before the advent of the music video, tracks which could not be performed live by musicians were accompanied by old film footage, edited especially for the programme, by film collection and archivist Philip Jenkinson.

After Harris's departure, Annie Nightingale took over as host. In December 1980, Nightingale presented the show in the immediate aftermath of the shooting of John Lennon (who had appeared on the show in 1975 also including two songs from A Band Called O). This particular episode consisted almost entirely of interviews with various people about Lennon's life and career.

Following the departure of Nightingale in 1982, Mark Ellen, David Hepworth and Richard Skinner also took turns as presenters. In 1983, the programme was moved to a live mid-evening slot. The title was abridged to Whistle Test and the title credits and music were changed. Andy Kershaw joined the series as a presenter in 1984. The same four presenters co-presented the BBC's television coverage of Live Aid in 1985.

The series was cancelled in early 1987 by Janet Street-Porter, who had been appointed head of Youth Programmes at the BBC. The series ended with a live New Year's Eve special, hosted by Bob Harris, broadcast through to the early hours of New Year's Day 1988: material included "Hotel California" by The Eagles, live from 1977, and "Bat Out of Hell" by Meat Loaf.

Owing to technical issues during the show's early years, and the need to ensure performances were controlled, the bands often recorded the instrumental tracks the day before. The vocals were then performed live, "99 percent" of the time. After 1973, the show changed to an entirely live format.

 30th anniversary 
On 23 February 2018 the BBC broadcast a special programme, hosted by Bob Harris, to mark the 30 years since the legendary series was last broadcast. This live studio show featured music, special guests and rare archive footage. It featured live performances from Kiki Dee, Peter Frampton, Wildwood Kin, Richard Thompson, Albert Lee and Robert Vincent.

Harris chatted to Whistle Test alumni, including Gary Numan, Dave Stewart, Joan Armatrading, Ian Anderson, Toyah Willcox, Dennis Locorriere, Chris Difford and Kiki Dee, as well as fan Danny Baker.

See also
 Top Gear, a 1964–1975 BBC radio programme that focused on progressive music.
 The Midnight Special, a 1972–1981 US television series of a similar format from the same time period.  
 Sounds of the 70s, a 1970s late night BBC radio programme which concentrated on albums rather than singles, and rock rather than pop.
 Top of the Pops, a British music chart television programme, made by the BBC and originally broadcast weekly from 1 January 1964 to 30 July 2006.
 Later... with Jools Holland'', a more recent BBC television series with a similar format.

References

External links 
 

1971 British television series debuts
1988 British television series endings
1970s British music television series
1980s British music television series
BBC Television shows
Rock music television series
English-language television shows